"Living on Video" is a song by Canadian synth-pop band Trans-X written and published in 1982, but not released as a single until May 1983 by Polydor Records, and then remixed in 1985. It became a massive hit worldwide, with the remixed version peaking at No. 9 on the UK Singles Chart and No. 61 on the Billboard Hot 100. Trans-X also originally recorded a French-language version under the title "Vivre sur Vidéo". The song has been covered by many artists throughout the years.

Trans-X version
The song was a big hit in Europe upon its release in 1983 and featured on the band's debut album, Living on Video. However, it only managed to reach No. 77 in the UK, which was in 1984. It was remixed and re-released in 1985 then becoming much more successful, peaking at No. 9 in the UK and also charting in the US, reaching No. 61 on the Billboard Hot 100. This version featured on the US version of band's 1986 second album, also called Living on Video. The band re-recorded the song in 1986 and released it as a 12" maxi single, although the fact that it was re-recorded was not mentioned. This featured on Canadian version of their second album.

Music video
The music video features the band performing the song in a room with several TVs and a Commodore PET. A Roland SH-101 keytar is also featured, which Languirand uses. It was filmed in Munich, Germany and is a live performance from the TV show  in 1984.

Track listings

1983
 7" single
 "Living on Video" — 4:18
 "Digital World" — 3:30
			
 12" single
 "Living on Video" (Long Version) — 5:55
 "Digital World" — 3:30

 12" maxi
 "Living on Video" — 5:55
 "Vivre sur Vidéo" — 6:13
"Living on Video" (Remix) — 6:42

1985
7" single

 "Living on Video" ('85 Big Mix) — 5:32
 "Digital Word" — 3:30

12" maxi

 "Living on Video" ('85 Big Mix) — 5:32
 "Living on Video" (Dub Mix) — 6:30
 "Digital Word" — 3:30

1986 
12" maxi

 "Living on Video" — 6:59
 "Living on Video" (Instrumental) — 5:00
 "Living on Video" (Radio Version) — 3:40

Charts

Weekly charts

Year-end charts

Other remixes and cover versions
It was remixed by Trans-X in 2003 and again 2006, and again by French DJ Pakito who also made it a hit. The song has also been remixed by U96 as Love Sees No Colour (Version 2), Nathalie De Borah, DJ Piccolo, Dr. Lektroluv, Trance XS, Cardenia, Cosmo & Tom, La Bouche, Culture Beat, DJ Interface, Ratty, Lazard, Gary D, Masterboy, Pin-Occhio (as "Tu Tatuta Tuta Ta"), Potatoheadz and by both Tronix Dj and Recorder, Stream (in 2016). It also has been covered as Vivre Sur Video by Vive la Fête. Most recently, it was covered by the band HexRX for the "Das Bunker: Choice of a New Generation" compilation. In 2012, "Robots", a single by Belgian singer Kate Ryan, sampled the song. Also, in 2013, it was used as the main theme in the song "Get Ready Now" by Beatmaker. Arash sampled the song in 2014 under the name SLR. Parts of the song has also been remixed by Logobi GT as Gâter le Koin (Album "La Puissance" in 2010). The electronic music band Frozen Plasma covered the song on their 2015 album Decadenz.

2 Brothers on the 4th Floor version

In 1999, 2 Brothers on the 4th Floor released their cover version of the song Living on Video titled Living in Cyberspace. Musically, it resembles the original score, but is adapted to the 1990s. The same applies in part to the text: The original text was indeed adopted, but supplemented by a few lines. Although the cover never appeared on a studio album, it is included in the compilations Summer Hit Mix 2000 and Best Of 2 Brothers On The 4th Floor.

Track listings 
CD-Maxi
 Living In Cyberspace (Snapshot RMX II) - 3:19	
 Living In Cyberspace (Radio Version) - 3:44	
 Living In Cyberspace (Lick Discomix) - 5:45

Charts

Pakito version

Pakito released their album Video containing the single and another remix. It reached number one in France for four weeks and hit the charts in several other countries. As of July 2014, it was the 85th best-selling single of the 21st century in France, with 328,000 units sold.

Track listings
 CD maxi
 "Living on Video" (original radio edit) — 3:20
 "Living on Video" (noot's vocal radio edit) — 3:10
 "Living on Video" (original mix) — 5:36
 "Living on Video" (noot's vocal mix) — 6:34

Charts and sales

Peak positions

End of year charts

Certifications

References

1982 songs
1983 singles
1999 singles
2006 debut singles
Canadian pop songs
Hi-NRG songs
SNEP Top Singles number-one singles
Number-one singles in Spain
2 Brothers on the 4th Floor songs
Pakito songs